Roberto Lauderdale (born 20 May 1981) is a Mexican bobsledder. He competed in the two man event at the 2002 Winter Olympics.

References

External links
 

1981 births
Living people
Mexican male bobsledders
Olympic bobsledders of Mexico
Bobsledders at the 2002 Winter Olympics
Place of birth missing (living people)